{{DISPLAYTITLE:N4-Chloroacetylcytosine arabinoside}}

N4-Chloroacetylcytosine arabinoside is a GABA agonist.

References 

Nucleosides
Acetamides
Organochlorides
Pyrimidones
GABAA-rho receptor agonists
Arabinosides
Hydroxymethyl compounds